Ghislaine Barnay (born 8 October 1945 in Fort-de-France, Martinique) is a former French athlete who specialises in the women's high jump. Barnay competed at the 1968 Summer Olympics.

Biography 

Ghislaine Barnay won three French National Athletic titles in the High Jump, in 1967, 1968, and 1969.  She bettered four times
the French High Jump record, jumping successively  1.73m, 1.74m and 1.76m in 1968, then 1.80m in 1969.

She participated in the 1968 Olympic Games at Mexico, and placed 
ninth in the final with a jump of 1.71m.

She married Roger Bambuck in 1974.

Palmarès 
French National Outdoor Athletic Championships :
 three times winner of the High Jump: 1967, 1968 and 1969.

Records

References 

 
 

1945 births
Living people
French female high jumpers
Olympic athletes of France
French people of Martiniquais descent
Athletes (track and field) at the 1968 Summer Olympics